The East Beach Bridge is a footbridge which crosses the River Lossie and connects Lossiemouth to the East Beach. The present bridge was opened in 2022 and replaced an older structure.

History 

The bridge was closed in July 2019 after an inspection. Members of the public had raised concerns that it was leaning to one side. The council blamed the deterioration of the structure on the large number of people using the bridge  The closure of the bridge resulted in a three mile diversion to reach the beach via Lossiemouth forest car park and Arthur's bridge.

In September 2019, it was announced that the Scottish Government would fund a new bridge. In August 2021, planning permission was given. The new bridge opened in May 2022. The old bridge was dismantled in June 2022.

Design 
The replacement bridge was designed and manufactured by Beaver Bridges of Glasgow and cost £1.8 million. The construction was funded by the Scottish Government however ongoing maintenance costs are covered by the council.

References 

Pedestrian bridges in Scotland
Transport in Moray
Lossiemouth
Bridges completed in 2022
Bridges across the River Lossie